High School U.S.A. is a 1983 NBC television movie starring Michael J. Fox, Anthony Edwards, Crispin Glover, Nancy McKeon and Todd Bridges.

High School USA may also refer to:
"High School U.S.A." (song), a 1959 song by Tommy Facenda
High School USA!, a 2013 animated television series created by Dino Stamatopoulos

See also 
 High school (United States)